Golden Years is a 1983 compilation album by David Bowie issued by RCA Records.

After 11 years with RCA Records, Bowie left the label and signed with EMI Records, releasing his highly successful album Let's Dance in 1983. Wishing to capitalize on Bowie's and the new album's popularity, RCA issued Golden Years, a compilation of previously released Bowie tracks. The cover art featured a recent photo of Bowie, giving a false first impression the album was an all-new release. All the tracks on this album were performed live by Bowie during his 1983 Serious Moonlight tour. Bowie was angered by the release of this LP and other compilations RCA issued without his consultation or input and he eventually reclaimed the rights to his back catalogue, soon after RCA reissued most of his earlier albums on compact disc in 1984 without his permission. As a result, Bowie's original RCA CD catalogue was in print only briefly; the RCA CDs are highly collectible today.

As this album, and the following compilation Fame and Fashion (David Bowie's All-Time Greatest Hits) were issued without Bowie's authorization, neither album has been reissued in any form.

Track listing 
All tracks written by David Bowie except where noted.

Side one 
"Fashion" – 4:51
"Red Sails" (Bowie, Brian Eno) – 3:47
"Look Back in Anger" (Bowie, Eno) – 3:07
"I Can't Explain" (Pete Townshend) – 2:14
"Ashes to Ashes" – 4:26

Side two 
"Golden Years" – 3:59
"Joe the Lion" – 3:08
"Scary Monsters (And Super Creeps)" – 5:14
"Wild Is the Wind" (Dimitri Tiomkin, Ned Washington) – 6:00

Chart performance

References

Sources

External links 

David Bowie compilation albums
1983 compilation albums
RCA Records compilation albums